Po Ladhuanpuguh (died 1799) was the ruler of Champa from 1793 to 1799. His Vietnamese name was Nguyễn Văn Hào (阮文豪).

Po Ladhuanpuguh was an officer of Champa court. In 1790, the leader of the Nguyễn lords, Nguyễn Ánh retook Gia Định (present-day Ho Chi Minh City), Po Ladhuanpuguh and prince Po Krei Brei (Nguyễn Văn Chiêu) joined Nguyễn army. Po Ladhuanpuguh and Po Krei Brei were appointed co-rulers of Champa by Nguyễn Ánh; they were granted the title cai cơ and chưởng cơ respectively. Po Ladhuanpuguh was the military governor, while Po Krei Brei served as the civilian governor. Since then, Champa was regarded as a province by Vietnam, instead of a country.

The Nguyễn army captured Băl Canar (Phan Rí) in 1793. Po Ladhuanpuguh captured Po Tisuntiraidapuran and had him executed. In the same year, Po Krei Brei was deposed. Po Ladhuanpuguh was promoted to chưởng cơ and became the sole ruler of Champa.

A Malay nobleman Tuan Phaow revolted against the Nguyễn lords in 1796. Po Ladhuanpuguh helped put down the rebellion. The following year, Tuan Phaow was defeated and fled to Kelantan.

Po Ladhuanpuguh died in 1799.

References

Kings of Champa
1799 deaths
Year of birth unknown